Kevin Castañeda Vargas (born 28 October 1999) is a Mexican professional footballer who plays as an attacking midfielder for Liga MX club Tijuana.

Club career

Toluca
Castañeda joined Deportivo Toluca for the Apertura 2018 tournament from the team's Youth System. On 22 July 2018, he made his league debut for Toluca against Monarcas Morelia. Castañeda scored his career's first goal at a Copa MX match against Juárez on 1 August 2018.

Castañeda finished as top scorer of the 2019–20 Copa MX.

Career statistics

Club

Honours
Individual
Copa MX Top Scorer: 2019–20

References

External links

1999 births
Living people
People from Guadalajara, Jalisco
Footballers from Jalisco
Association football midfielders
Deportivo Toluca F.C. players
Mexican footballers